Step Outside is a 1986 album by British folk rock band The Oyster Band. The album was the first release of Cooking Vinyl records. The album was chosen as one of the 50 best of the year in Q Magazine.

Track listing
 "Hal-an-Tow" (Trad.) - 4:22
 "Flatlands" (Ian Telfer) - 5:42
 "Another Quiet Night in England" (John L. Jones, Telfer) - 4:21
 "Ashes to Ashes" (Telfer, Ian Kearney, Alan Prosser) - 3:43
 "Molly Bond" (Trad.) - 4:29
 "Bully in the Alley" (Telfer, Jones) - 4:57
 "The Day that the Ship Goes Down" (Telfer, Jones) - 4:28
 "Gaol Song" (Trad.) - 3:40
 "The Old Dance" (Telfer) - 4:21
 "Bold Riley" (Trad.) - 4:16

References

External links
Allmusic review
official website

1986 albums
Oysterband albums
Cooking Vinyl albums